Stefano Garzon (born December 23, 1981 in Cerea) is an Italian professional football player currently playing for Lecco Calcio.

Career
He made his Serie A debut on November 12, 2006 for A.C. ChievoVerona in a game against U.C. Sampdoria when he came on as a substitute in the 82nd minute for Paolo Sammarco.

In January 2008 he left for Verona on loan and in summer 2008 Verona bought half of the registration rights. In June 2009 he deal became permanent.

References

External links
 
 

1981 births
Living people
Italian footballers
Serie A players
Serie B players
A.C. ChievoVerona players
U.S. Cremonese players
F.C. Pavia players
S.S.D. Varese Calcio players
Delfino Pescara 1936 players
U.S. Avellino 1912 players
Hellas Verona F.C. players
Calcio Lecco 1912 players
Association football midfielders